The German federal motorways are now numbered according to a clear system. Since the mid-1970s there has been a numbering system for motorways, which sets out which number is replaced by a new motorway. Motorways with a single-digit number (e.g. A 1) are of national or even cross-border significance. Highways with a two-digit number (e.g. A 20) are usually of overriding national importance. Highways with three digits (e.g. A 999) are generally of regional or urban significance; often these motorways are feeders or detours. If there is more than one digit, the first digit indicates the approximate location of the motorway (A 10 to A 19 for Berlin; A 20 in the north to A99 in the south, A 100 for Berlin; A 200 in the north to A 999 in the south). Usually highways with even numbers predominantly run east–west, and those with odd numbers run north–south. Exceptions include the A14 and the A15.

A 1 to A 9

A 10 to A 19

A 20 to A 29

A 30 to A 39

A 40 to A 49

A 50 to A 59

A 60 to A 69

A 70 to A 79

A 80 to A 89

A 90 to A 99

A 100 to A 199

A 200 to A 299

A 300 to A 399

A 400 to A 499

A 500 to A 599

A 600 to A 699

A 700 to A 799

A 800 to A 899

A 900 to A 999

See also 
 List of federal roads in Germany
 List of expressways
 Bundesverkehrswegeplan 2030

References

External links 

 
 Liste aller deutschen Autobahnen
 Patricks Autobahn-Atlas
 Verkehrsprognose Nordrhein-Westfalen (OLSIM)
 Autobahn-Ausweichflugplätze auf geschichtsspuren.de (vormals lostplaces.de)
 Vorgeschichte der Autobahnen (to 1924 zurück) und Relikte angefangener Projekte auf geschichtsspuren.de (vormals lostplaces)
 Entwicklung des Autobahnnetzes in Deutschland beim Leibniz-Institut für ökologische Raumentwicklung

Autobahns